Dagoberto Borges (born 16 January 1940) is a Cuban fencer. He competed in the individual and team foil events at the 1968 Summer Olympics.

References

1940 births
Living people
Cuban male fencers
Olympic fencers of Cuba
Fencers at the 1968 Summer Olympics
People from Havana
Pan American Games medalists in fencing
Pan American Games bronze medalists for Cuba
Fencers at the 1967 Pan American Games